‌The 2021 Nor.Ca. Women's Handball Championship was the fourth edition of the championship, held from 22 to 27 August 2021 at Elgin, United States under the aegis of North America and Caribbean Handball Confederation. It was the first time in history that the championship is organised by the USA Team Handball. It also acted as the qualification tournament for the 2021 World Women's Handball Championship, with the top team from the championship directly qualifying for the event to be held in Spain. The tournament was held behind closed doors, due to the COVID-19 pandemic.

Puerto Rico won the final 34–24 against Greeland, to capture their second title.

Teams
Four teams participated.

Referees
The following four referee pairs were selected.

Preliminary round

Standings

Fixtures

Knockout stage

Third place game

Final

Final standing

All Star Team
The all-star team was announced on 25 August 2021.

Squads

Greenland
Head coach: Johannes Groth

Players of the 22 squad but not selected
The 22-woman squad was announced on 5 May 2021.

Mexico
Head coach: ?

Puerto Rico
Head coach: Camilo Estevez

United States
Head coach: Julio Sainz

Players of the 28 squad but not selected
The 28-woman squad was announced on 9 June 2021.

References

External links
Official website

 
Nor.Ca. Women's Handball Championship
Nor.Ca Women's Handball Championship
Nor.Ca
Nor.Ca.
Nor.Ca. Women's Handball Championship
International handball competitions hosted by the United States
Sports competitions in Illinois
Women's sports in Illinois